"Better Not Tell Her" is a song written and performed by American singer-songwriter Carly Simon, and produced by Frank Filipetti and Paul Samwell-Smith. The opening track from Simon's 15th studio album, Have You Seen Me Lately (1990), the song also served as the album's lead single.

A salsa-infused track, the song features a Spanish guitar solo by Jay Berliner. The single was a huge Adult Contemporary hit, remaining on the Billboard Adult Contemporary chart for 21 weeks, peaking at No. 4, and becoming Simon's biggest hit of the entire decade. The second single from the album, "Holding Me Tonight", was also successful on this chart, peaking at No. 36. Simon released music videos for both singles, and they each received airplay on VH1.

The song is one of Simon's biggest Adult contemporary hits, and has been included on multiple compilations of her work, such as the three-disc box set Clouds in My Coffee (1995), the UK release The Very Best of Carly Simon: Nobody Does It Better (1998), the two-disc retrospective Anthology (2002), the single-disc Reflections: Carly Simon's Greatest Hits (2004), and Sony Music's Playlist: The Very Best of Carly Simon (2014).

Formats and track listings
7" single
 "Better Not Tell Her" – 4:40
 "Happy Birthday" – 4:54

CD single
 "Better Not Tell Her" – 4:45

Charts

Music video
Simon filmed a sensual music video for the track, which was shot on a beach on Martha's Vineyard in July 1990 - at the estate of Jackie Onassis. The video alternates between clips of Simon on the beachfront in the day, during the evening in the same sitting, and at night with a roaring bonfire while she and company dance around and play guitars.

References

External links
Carly Simon's Official Website

1990 songs
Songs written by Carly Simon
Carly Simon songs
Arista Records singles
1990 singles
Song recordings produced by Paul Samwell-Smith
Pop ballads